Fourmile, also known as Redlawn, is an unincorporated community in Shelby County, Alabama, United States. Some of the early settlers of Fourmile came from Lexington County and Newberry County, South Carolina.

Fourmile Baptist Church was founded on August 25, 1824, (under the name of Bethesda Baptist Church) and is the oldest continuously functioning church in the Shelby Baptist Association. The Shelby Baptist Association was founded at Bethesda Baptist Church in 1852. It is also one of the oldest existing churches of the Alabama Baptist Convention. One of the prominent early members of the church was John W. Teague, who was an early settler of Columbiana and the father of Eldred B. Teague. E. B. Teague lived on a farm in Fourmile, which he named Red Lawn. Fourmile was also the location of Blue Springs Methodist Church, which was founded in 1890. The church closed in 2004.

A post office was established under the name Redlawn in 1898, at the residence of Pickens Miner, who served as the first postmaster. The post office was in operation until 1904.

One site in Fourmile, Jackson's Fourmile Farm, is listed on the Alabama Register of Landmarks and Heritage.

Gallery

References 

Unincorporated communities in Shelby County, Alabama
Unincorporated communities in Alabama